Pagan Moon is a 1932 Warner Bros. Merrie Melodies cartoon directed by Rudolf Ising. The short was released on January 31, 1932.

Summary
The iris opens to two Polynesian natives, a boy and a girl, on a beach at dusk; the boy sings the title song and accompanies himself on a ukulele before switching to scatting; occasionally, the camera cuts to two older ukulelists. The island joins in the musical number: a monkey perched atop a palm tree plays cocoanuts, his drumsticks bones; a larger primate, angry at being disturbed by the percussion, emerges, but his scolding is cut short when the monkey knocks the reprehending ape out with one of the bones; another palm tree dances excitedly to the tune; on the branch of another tree, three little birds and their parent dance.

The boy, again at his ukulele, ends the number after jumping onto what he believes to be a safe stretch of land but is, in fact, a crocodile; astonished, the boy leaps up and away, dropping his instrument, which falls into the great reptile's maw. Unable at first for fear to attempt the beast's mouth, the clever boy offers a sturdy stick, which the animal is all too willing to swallow: the little hero places the stick upright in the crocodile's dilated jaws and, in the resulting reprieve, reaches down his throat and fetches the lute; this done, the boy taunts his foe with a few carefree plucks of the strings.

He then dances across some pond rocks, ending upon the shell-back of an unamused turtle, who carries the boy to land and curtly drops him off. The boy then skips over some more rocks to meet his sweetheart, who sits in a small boat; he fools around with his ukulele and drops it into the water. He dives down to rescue it, avoiding a rather menacing-looking fish, swimming past some smaller fish flopping melodically upon a submerged piano, and using the same instrument to entertain a disgruntled octopus, all without rising for breath!

A fish-trumpeter joins in his number, as do a family of anchovies in a pair of fishing boots, a trombonist (whose instrument's slide is operated with the help of a wrecked ship's steering wheel), and another fish that may be a clarinetist. A spontaneously gathered fish-audience applaud after the performance, but the now docile cephalopod interrupts them to play a tune on the piano, scatting as he plays. The boy and the fishes clap and cheer until the great fish from a few moments ago appears again; the other sea-creatures having escaped, the boy runs to a large piece of pipe suspended in the sea-floor.

Blowing into the pipe, he produces a bubble large enough to carry him: now sliding through the pipe, the boy places himself within the nascent bubble. Releasing itself from the pipe, the bubble floats to and well past the surface: high in the air, a sharp-beaked bird toys with boy and bubble for a bit, then pops it, the explosion denuding the creature of his feathers. Seeing her sweetheart falling out of the sky, the girl rows in his direction, spotting a pelican as she does so: abandoning her little ship, she boards the bird, which, having been ordered forward, catches the boy in his beak, where the hero and the girl embrace, eyes rolling affectionately, as the iris shuts.

Reused animation
The dancing palm tree from the first musical number in the cartoon appears to be recycled from the Bosko short "Congo Jazz."

When underwater the boy hides from a big fish which had been used in the cartoon "Bosko at the Zoo", released a couple of weeks before this one.

Home media
The cartoon is available on laserdisc in Volume Three of The Golden Age of Looney Tunes.

References

External links
 
 Pagan Moon on YouTube

1932 films
1932 animated films
Films scored by Frank Marsales
Films about music and musicians
Films directed by Rudolf Ising
Films set in Polynesia
Merrie Melodies short films
American black-and-white films
1930s Warner Bros. animated short films